Yeknam (also Romanized as Yekonem and Yakonom; also known as Yakunim, Yakūnom, and Yekow Nīm) is a village in Jirandeh Rural District, Amarlu District, Rudbar County, Gilan Province, Iran. At the 2006 census, its population was 152, in 57 families.

References 

Populated places in Rudbar County